Meridian Road is a national historic site that runs roughly between John Hancock Dr. in  Tallahassee, Florida to Georgia State Line. Its relevance is associated with the development of Leon County, as it was used to move agricultural products from the locals plantations to the capital city.

It was added to the National Register of Historic Places on March 20, 2013.

References

National Register of Historic Places in Leon County, Florida